My Father Is an Airplane is a 2021 Dutch psychological drama film directed by Antoinette Beumer from a screenplay by Maaik Krijgsman, based on the novel of the same name by Beumer. The film premiered as the opening film of the Netherlands Film Festival before its nationwide theatrical release. The film was nominated for three Golden Calf awards, including Best Feature Film and Best Leading Role (Elise Schaap). Both Algemeen Dagblad and NRC praised the film.

References

External links
 

2021 films
2021 drama films
2020s Dutch-language films
2020s psychological drama films
Dutch psychological drama films
Films about father–daughter relationships
Films based on Dutch novels